This article is a list of King's and Queen's commissioners of the province of Flevoland, Netherlands.

List of King's and Queen's commissioners of Flevoland

References

Flevoland
King's and Queen's Commissioners